The 1934 New Mexico A&M Aggies football team was an American football team that represented New Mexico College of Agriculture and Mechanical Arts (now known as New Mexico State University) as a member of the Border Conference during the 1934 college football season.  In its fifth year under head coach Jerry Hines, the team compiled a 4–1–3 record (0–1–3 against conference opponents), finished fifth in the conference, and outscored opponents by a total of 169 to 25.

Schedule

References

New Mexico AandM
New Mexico State Aggies football seasons
New Mexico AandM Aggies football